Robert Cameron was a Scottish professional footballer who played as a forward.

Kelly was recruited from Glasgow and was paid £18 signing on fee. On 3 September 1892 while playing against Sheffield United he scored Lincoln City's first ever Football League goal, he only scored 2 more goals in his next 14 league matches and eventually replaced by fellow Scot Jock Fleming.

References

Scottish footballers
Association football forwards
Lincoln City F.C. players
English Football League players
Year of death missing
Year of birth missing